The second season of the Showcase television series Continuum premiered on April 21, 2013 and concluded on August 4, 2013. The series is created by Simon Barry. The series centers on Kiera Cameron (Rachel Nichols) as she time travels from 2077 to 2012 with a group of terrorists, and attempts to find a way home.  All the episodes titles in this season use the word "Second."

Cast and characters

Main
 Rachel Nichols as CPS "Protector"/Agent Kiera Cameron
 Victor Webster as Detective Carlos Fonnegra
 Erik Knudsen as a young Alec Sadler
 Roger Cross as Travis Verta
 Stephen Lobo as Matthew Kellog
 Lexa Doig as Sonya Valentine
 Omari Newton as Lucas Ingram
 Luvia Petersen as Jasmine Garza
 Brian Markinson as Inspector Dillon
 Jennifer Spence as Betty Robertson
 Richard Harmon as Julian Randol/Theseus

Recurring
 Magda Apanowicz as Emily
 John Cassini as Marco
 William B. Davis as an elderly Alec Sadler
 Hugh Dillon as Escher/Marc Sadler
 Janet Kidder as Ann Sadler
 Darcy Laurie as Detective Martinez
 Tahmoh Penikett as Jim Martin
 Adam Greydon Reid as Clayton
 Ian Tracey as Jason Sadler
 Nicholas Lea as Agent Gardiner

Episodes

The season's premiere episode received 378,000 viewers.

References

External links
 
 

2013 Canadian television seasons
2